The non-marine molluscs of Venezuela are a part of the molluscan fauna of Venezuela (which is part of the wildlife of Venezuela). Non-marine molluscs are the snails, clams and mussels that live in freshwater habitats, and the snails and slugs that live on land. Sea-dwelling molluscs are not included in this list.

A number of species of non-marine molluscs are found in the wild in Venezuela.

Historical background

Studies on the knowledge of the Venezuelan malacofauna begin in the nineteenth century with the work of German malacologist Eduard von Martens around 1873 who published the first list of the mollusks Venezuela. Three years later the German-Venezuelan Adolfo Ernst, taking as its starting point and extending Martens list, published a second list in 1876. Subsequent to these two pioneering nineteenth century works, only sporadic descriptions were published in foreign publications. It took about half a century for new listings of malacofauna of Venezuela to be published, this time by American H. B. Baker in the mid-1920s.

Following Baker's work is beginning to make as many Venezuelan species descriptions and numerous national and regional listings including listings include:
Adolfo Lutz, who in 1928 lists and makes observations on malacofauna Valencia lake and surrounding areas, H. Richards G. Hummelinck & P. W. Malacofauna 1940 describing the island of Margarita, Arias in 1952 and 1953 in which he describes the fauna of the regions of Baruta, El Hatillo and Perija region; Thompson, who in 1957 described the shellfish National Park Henri Pittier and surrounding areas; Martinez and Miranda in 1968 described pulmonate molluscs of Caracas and surrounding areas, Fernández in 1982, which describes sitecueros  of slugs and Venezuela, Martinez et al. in 2004 which states bivalve fauna Venezuela freshwater, Lasso and collaborators in 2009 which describes the fauna of the basin of the Orinoco.

Diversity 

The Venezuelan malacofauna not marine mollusks is composed of classes Gastropoda and Bivalvia, presenting a greater diversity of species in the gastropod.

In the freshwater gastropod families with more species are Ampullariidae (35 spp.) And Planorbidae (15 spp.). In terrestrial gastropods include Ortalicidae (35 spp.) and Subulinidae (16 spp.).

Among the bivalve families with more species are Mycetopodidade (17 spp.) and Hyriidae (10 spp.)

Regarding the introduced species, the largest number of species is between terrestrial mollusks, primarily on families Subulinidae (6 spp.), Limacidae (4 spp.) And Helicidae (3 spp.)

Distribution

The Venezuelan malacofauna marina not primarily distributed throughout the entire Venezuelan territory, but the greatest number of species and greater distribution has been reported for the river basin Orinoco. The vast majority of species usually live in areas calm water pipes or flooding of rivers and lakes. Many of the species usually have local distributions such as slugs and seven of leathers that often live primarily in the areas of cultivation in the north and the Andean region, However extend very widely distributed species that can be located throughout the country as in the case of molluscs Ampullariidae amphibians and within the family which include Marisa cornuarietis, Pomacea urceus (Guarura), Pomacea glauca, Pomacea dolioides. Among the highlights landshells Megalobulimus oblongus (Guacara).

In relation to introduced species is noteworthy that some of it was spread widely by middle natural environment among them are: Achatina fulica (Giant African Snail), Arion subfuscus Subulina octona, and Thiara granifera Melanoides tuberculata.

List of non-marine molluscs of Venezuela
The list of non-marine molluscs of Venezuela consists of:
 Freshwater gastropods: 9 families, 19 genera, 82 species.
 Terrestrial gastropods: 26 families, 58 genera, 116 species.
 Freshwater bivalves: 5 families, 11 genera, 31 species.

In total 30 families are listed, 88 genera and 229 species.

Freshwater gastropods 

Freshwater gastropods include:

Ampullariidae
 Asolene crassa (Swainson, 1823)
 Marisa cornuarietis (Linnaeus, 1758)
 Pomacea amazonica (Revee, 1856)
 Pomacea aurostoma (Lea, 1856)
 Pomacea avellana (Sowerby, 1909)
 Pomacea bridgesi (Reeve, 1856) (Introduced species)
 Pomacea camena (Pain, 1956)
 Pomacea canaliculata (Lamarck, 1819) (Introduced species)
 Pomacea chemnitzii (Philippi, 1887)
 Pomacea cingulata (Philippi, 1851)
 Pomacea crassa (Swainson, 1823)
 Pomacea dolioides (Revee, 1856)
 Pomacea eximia (Dunker, 1853)
 Pomacea falconensis Pain y Arias, 1958
 Pomacea glauca (Linnaeus, 1758)
 Pomacea glauca crocostoma (Philippi, 1852)
 Pomacea glauca gevesensis (Deshayes, 1801)
 Pomacea glauca luteostoma (Swainson, 1822 )
 Pomacea glauca orinocensis (Troschel,  1848)
 Pomacea haustrum (Revee, 1856)
 Pomacea interrupta (Sowerby, 1909)
 Pomacea lineata (Spix, 1827)
 Pomacea minuscula Baker 1930
 Pomacea nobilis (Revee, 1856)
 Pomacea oblonga (Swainson, 1823)
 Pomacea papyracea (Spix, 1827)
 Pomacea patula (Revee, 1856)
 Pomacea semitecta (Mousson, 1873)
 Pomacea superba (Marshall, 1928)
 Pomacea swainsoni (Revee, 1856)
 Pomacea tamsiana (Philippi, 1852)
 Pomacea urceus (Müller, 1774)
 Pomacea urceus guyanensis (Lamarck, 1810)
 Pomacea urceus olivacea (Spix, 1827)
 Pomacea vexillun (Revee, 1856)

Ancylidae
 Gundlachia saulcyana (Bourguignat, 1853)
 Hebetancylus moricandi (D’Orbigny, 1837)

Hydrobiidae

 Pyrgophorus coronatus (Pfeiffer, 1840)
 Pyrgophorus ernesti (Martens, 1873)
 Pyrgophorus globulus (Baker, 1930)
 Pyrgophorus parvulus (Guilding, 1828)
 Pyrgophorus putialis (Baker, 1930)
 Pyrgophorus platyrachis Thompson, 1968

Lymnaeidae
There are two native and four introduced species of Lymnaeidae in Venezuela:
 Lymnaea meridensis Bargues, Artigas & Mas-Coma, 2011 - synonym: Galba cousini (Jousseaume, 1887) hitherto known from Venezuelan highlands - native
 Galba neotropica (Bargues, Artigas, Mera y Sierra, Pointier & Mas-Coma, 2007) - native
 Galba cubensis  (Pfeiffer, 1839) - introduced from the Caribbean area
 Pseudosuccinea columella (Say, 1817) - introduced from the Caribbean area
 Galba truncatula (O. F. Müller, 1774) - introduced from the Old World,
 Galba viatrix (D’Orbigny, 1835) from Venezuela was identified as Galba truncatula
 Galba schirazensis (Küster, 1862) - introduced from the Old World

Neritidae
 Neritina meleagris (Lamarck, 1822)
 Neritina piratica Russell,   1943
 Neritina puncticulata (Lamarck, 1816)
 Neritina reclivata (Say, 1822)
 Neritina virginea (Linnaeus 1758)

Pachychilidae
 Doryssa atra (Bruguièri, 1792)
 Doryssa consolidata (Bruguièri, 1789)
 Doryssa grunei (Jonas, 1844)
 Doryssa lamarckiana (Brot, 1870)
 Doryssa hohenackeri (Philippi, 1851)
 Doryssa kappleri (Vernhout, 1914)
 Doryssa transversa (Lea, 1850)
 Pachychilus laevisimus (Sowerby, 1824)

Physidae

 Aplexa rivalis (Manton & Rackett, 1807)
 Stenophysa acuminata (Gray & Sowerby, 1873)

Planorbidae
 Biomphalaria glabrata (Say, 1818)
 Biomphalaria havanensis (Dunker, 1850)
 Biomphalaria kuhniama (Clessin, 1883)
 Biomphalaria peregrina  (D’Orbigny, 1835)
 Bionphalaria pronum (Von Martens 1873)
 Biomphalaria straminea  (Dunker, 1848)
 Biomphalaria tenagofila (D’Orbigny, 1835)
 Drepanotrema anatium (D’Orbigny, 1835)
 Drepanotrema cimex (Moricand, 1839)
 Drepanotrema depressissmum (Moricand, 1839)
 Drepanotrema kermatoides (D’Orbigny, 1835)
 Drepanotrema lucidum (Pfeiffer, 1839)
 Drepanotrema surinamensis (Dunker & Clessin, 1884)

 Planorbella duryi (Wetherby 1879) (introduced species)
 Planorbis circumlineatus  Shuttleworth, 1854

Thiaridae
 Aylacostoma lineolata (Gray, 1828)
 Aylacostoma stringillata (Dumker, 1843)
 Aylacostoma venezuelensis (Dumker & Revee, 1859)
 Melanoides tuberculata (Müller, 1774) (introduced species)
 Thiara granifera (Lamarck, 1822) (introduced species)

Land gastropods 
Land gastropods include:

Achatinidae
 Achatina fulica (Bowdich, 1822) (introduced species)

Arionidae

 Arion subfuscus (Draparnaud, 1805) (introduced species)

Bradybaenidae

 Bradybaena similaris (Fèrussac, 1821) (introduced species)

Clausiliidae
 Bequaertinenia bequaerti (Arias, 1953)
 Columbina cyclostoma (Pfeiffer, 1849)
 Gonionenia dohrni (Pfeiffer, 1860)
 Nenia geayi (Jousseaume, 1849)

Euconulidae
 Guppya gundlachi (Pfeiffer)
 Habroconus cassiquiensis (Pfeiffer, 1853)
 Habroconus ernsti (Jousseaume)

Ferussaciidae
 Cecilioides acicula (Müller 1774) (introduced species)
 Cecilioides aperta (Swainson, 1840) (introduced species)
 Cecilioides consobrina (d’Orbigny, 1842)

Helicidae

Cornu aspersum = Helix aspersa (Müller, 1774) (introduced species)
 Helix pomatia Linnaeus, 1758 (introduced species)
 Theba pisana (Müller, 1774) (introduced species)

Helicinidae
 Helicina microdina (Morelet, 1854)
 Helicina microdina huberi Breure, 1976

 Helicina tamsiana (Pfeiffer, 1850)
 Helicina tamsiana appuni (Von Marten, 1873)

Limacidae
 Agriolimax laevis (Müller, 1774) (introduced species)
 Agriolimax reticulatus (Müller, 1774) (introduced species)
 Lehmannia valenciana (Férussac, 1822) (introduced species)
 Milax gagates (Draparnaud) (introduced species)

Strophocheilidae
 Megalobulimus oblongus (Müller, 1774)

Neocyclotidae

 Incidostoma nanun (Bartsch & Morrrison, 1942)
 Poteria fasciatum (Kobelt & Schwanheim, 1912)
 Poteria translucida (Sowerby, 1843)

Amphibulimidae

 Dryptus marmoratus (Dunker, 1844)
 Plekocheilus blainvilleanus (Pfeiffer, 1848)
 Plekocheilus breweri Breure & Schlögl, 2010
 Plekocheilus coloratus (Nyst, 1845)
 Plekocheilus gibber (Oberwimmer, 1931)
 Plekocheilus huberi Breure, 2009
 Plekocheilus nebulosus Breure, 2009
 Plekocheilus pardalis (Férrusac, 1821)
 Plekocheilus sophiae Breure, 2009
 Plekocheilus tatei Haas, 1955
 Plekocheilus tepuiensis Breure, 2009
 Plekocheilus veranyi  (Pfeiffer, 1847)
 Plekocheilus vlceki Breure & Schlögl, 2010
 Eudolichotis aurissciuri (Guppy, 1866)
 Eudolichotis distorta (Bruguière)
 Eudolichotis euryomphala (Jonas, 1844)

Orthalicidae

 Auris sinuata (Albers, 1854)
 Oxystyla abducta (Shuttleworth, 1856)
 Oxystyla maracaibensis (Pfeiffer, 1899)

Bulimulidae
 Bulimulus dysoni Pfeiffer
 Bulimulus cacticolus Reeve
 Bulimulus constrictus Pfeiffer
 Bulimulus krebsianus Pilsbry, 1897
 Drymaeus extraneus (Haas, 1955) - synonym: Drymaeus griffini Haas, 1955
 Drymaeus grandensis (Pfeiffer, 1847)
 Drymaeus imperfectus (Guppy, 1866)
 Drymaeus meridanus (Pfeiffer)
 Drymaeus multilineatus (Say, 1825)
 Drymaeus rex Breure, 2009
 Drymaeus ruthveni Baker, 1926
 Drymaeus trigonostomus (Jonas, 1844)
 Drymaeus trigonostomus knorri (Pfeiffer, 1846)
 Drymaeus virgulatus (Férussac)

Simpulopsidae
 Simpulopsis magnus gg

Odontostomidae
 Tomigerus cumingi Pfeiffer

Pleurodontidae

 Labyrinthus leucodon (Pfeiffer, 1847)
 Labyrinthus plicatus (Born, 1780)
 Labyrinthus tamsiana (Dunker, 1847) )
 Labyrinthus umbrus (Thompson, 1957)
 Solaropsis venezuelensis Preston, 1909

Pupillidae

 Pupoides marginatus nitidulus (Pfeiffer, 1839)
 Bothriopupa tenuidens (Adams)

Sagdidae
 Xenodiscula venezuelensis Pilsbry, 1919

Scolodontidae
 Systrophia starkii (H. B. Baker)

Systrophiidae
 Drepanostomella pinchoti Pilsbry, 1930

Spiraxidae
 Pseudosubulina decussata Baker, 1926
 Pseudosubulina chaperi (Jousseaume 1889)
 Spiraxis blandi (Crosse, 1874)

Streptaxidae
 Gulella bicolor (Hutton, 1834) (introduced species)
 Streptaxis glaber Pfeiffer

Subulinidae

 Allopeas gracile (Hutton, 1834)
 Allopeas micra (d’Orbigny, 1835) (introduced species)
 Beckianum beckianum (L. Pfeiffer, 1846)
 Dysopeas subopacum (Baker, 1927)
 Dysopeas translucidum (Baker, 1927)
 Lamellaxis martensiana (Baker, 1927)
 Lamellaxis mauritianus (Pfeiffer, 1952) (introduced species)
 Lamellaxis pachyspira Pilsbry 1905
 Leptinaria unilamellata (D’Orbigny, 1837)
 Leptopeas venezuelensis (Pfeiffer, 1856)
 Obeliscus octogyrus (Pfeiffer, 1850)
 Obeliscus rectus Baker, 1927
 Opeas gracile (Hutton, 1834) (introduced species)
 Opeas pellucidum (Pfeiffer, 1847)
 Opeas pumilum (Pfeiffer, 1847) (introduced species)
 Opeas pyrgula Schmacker and Boettger, 1891 (introduced species)
Subulina octona (Bruguière, 1798) (introduced species)
 Subulina striatella (Rang, 1831) (introduced species)

Succineidae
 Omalonyx felina Guppy 1878
 Omalonyx pattersonae Tillier, 1891
 Succinea tamsiana Pfeiffer

Thysanophoridae
 Thysanophora canalis (Pilsbry, 1910)
 Thysanophora plagiptycha (Shuttleworth, 1854)
 Thysanophora satanaensis (Pfeiffer, 1854)

Urocoptidae
 Brachypodella hanleyana (Pfeiffer, 1847)
 Brachypodella leucopleura (Menke, 1847)
 Brachypodella nidicostata Spence, 1920

Veronicellidae

 Diplosolenodes occidentalis (Guilding, 1825)
 Diplosolenodes bielenbergii (Semper, 1885)
 Forcatulus coerulescens (Semper, 1885)
 Latipes pterocaulis (Simroth, 1914)
 Microveronicella diminuta (Simroth, 1914)
 Sarasinula linguaeformis (Semper, 1885)
 Sarasinula plebeia (Fischer, 1868)

Vertiginidae
 Gastrocopta barbadensis (Pfeiffer, 1853)
 Gastrocopta iheringi (Suter, 1900)
 Gastrocopta geminidens (Pilsbry)

Xanthonychidae
 Averellia coactiliata (Férrussac, 1838)

Freshwater bivalves

Corbiculidae
 Corbicula fluminalis (Múller, 1774) (introduced species)

Corbulidae
 Cyanocyclas cuneata Say, 1822

Hyriidae
 Castalia ambigua Lamarck, 1819
 Castalia orinocensis Morrison, 1943
 Castalia schombergiana Sowerby, 1869
 Castalia stevensi (Baker, 1930)
 Dilodon granosus Bruguiere, 1782
 Dilodon losadae Haas, 1819
 Dilodon flucki Morrison 1943
 Paxyodon syrmatophorus Meuschen, 1781
 Prisodon obliquus (Schumacher, 1871)
 Triplodon stevensii Lea, 1871

Mycetopodidae
 Anodontites crispatus Bruguiere, 1792
 Anodontites elongatus (Swainson, 1823)
 Anodontites ensiformes (Spix, 1827)
 Anodontites guanarensis Marshall, 1928
 Anodontites infossa Baker, 1930
 Anodontites pittieri Marshall, 1922
 Anodontites schombergianus Sowerby, 1870
 Anodontites leotaudi (Guppy, 1866)
 Anodontites tenebricosus D’Orbigny, 1835
 Anodontites tortilis (Lea, 1852)
 Anodontites trapezeus (Spix, 1827)
 Anodontites trapesialis Lamarck, 1819
 Anodontites trigona (Spix, 1827)
 Mycetopoda pittieri Marshall, 1919
 Mycetopoda soleniformes D’Orbigny, 1835
 Tamsiella tamsiana Dunker, 1895

Pisidiidae
 Eupera bahiensis (Spix, 1827)
 Eupera modioliforme Anton, 1837
 Eupera simoni Jousseaume, 1889

See also
 List of echinoderms of Venezuela
 List of Poriferans of Venezuela
 List of introduced molluscs of Venezuela
 List of marine molluscs of Venezuela
 List of molluscs of Falcón state, Venezuela
 List of non-marine molluscs of El Hatillo Municipality, Miranda, Venezuela
 List of birds of Venezuela
 List of mammals of Venezuela

Lists of molluscs of surrounding countries:
 List of non-marine molluscs of Colombia
 List of non-marine molluscs of Guyana
 List of non-marine molluscs of Brazil

Overseas:
 List of non-marine molluscs of Trinidad and Tobago
 List of non-marine molluscs of Grenada
 List of non-marine molluscs of Curaçao
 List of non-marine molluscs of Aruba

References

External links 
 Breure A. S. H. (2009). Radiation in land snails on Venezuelan tepui islands. In: Cohen A. et al. (eds.) Evolutionary islands: 150 years after Darwin Abstracts: 38. Leiden. PDF.
 Breure A. S. H. (1976). "Over de landmollusken van het Nationale Park "Henri Pittier", Venezuela". Correspondentieblad van de Nederlandse Malacologische Vereniging 172: 569–572. PDF.
 Breure A. S. H. (1975). "Description of a collecting trip in Peru, Ecuador, Colombia and Venezuela". De Kreukel 11'(7): 83–116. PDF.

non marine
Molluscs, Non Marine
Venezuela
non-marine molluscs
Venezuela
Venezuela, Non
Venezuela